is a species of wasp in the family Vespidæ.

References

darius